Bruce Roberts (born 3 November 1957) is a Canadian middle-distance runner. He competed in the men's 800 metres at the 1984 Summer Olympics.

References

1957 births
Living people
Athletes (track and field) at the 1984 Summer Olympics
Canadian male middle-distance runners
Olympic track and field athletes of Canada
Place of birth missing (living people)